Six ships of the Royal Navy have borne the name HMS Barracouta, after the fish Thyrsites atun. Another was renamed before being launched:

 was a 14-gun sloop, previously a cutter. She was purchased in 1782 and sold in 1792. She became the privateer cutter Thought, which the French captured in 1793. She became a French privateer and sailed under various names until captured as Vedette in 1800. The Royal Navy took her into service as HMS Vidette, but sold her in 1802, never having commissioned her.
 was a 4-gun schooner launched in 1804 and wrecked in 1805.
 was a  launched in 1807 and sold in 1815.
 was a 10-gun  launched in 1820. She was commissioned as a Falmouth packet in 1829 and was sold in 1836.
 was a wooden paddle sloop launched in 1851 and broken up in 1881.
 was a third class cruiser launched in 1889 and sold in 1905.

Royal Navy ship names